Steinitz is a village and a former municipality in the district Altmarkkreis Salzwedel, in Saxony-Anhalt, Germany. Since January 2011, it is part of the town Salzwedel.

References

Former municipalities in Saxony-Anhalt
Salzwedel